Claudia Williams (born 29 February 1996 in Wellington) is a New Zealand tennis player.

Williams has won one doubles title on the ITF tour in her career. On 8 June 2015 she reached her best singles ranking of world number 573. On 29 December 2014 she peaked at world number 502 for doubles.

Williams made her WTA tour debut at the 2013 ASB Classic.

Her last tour match was a doubles semi-final in an ITF $15,000 event in Cúcuta, Colombia, in November 2018.

ITF finals: 3 (1 title, 2 runners-up)

Doubles: 3 (1 title, 2 runners-up)

References 
 
 

1996 births
Living people
Sportspeople from Wellington City
New Zealand female tennis players
21st-century New Zealand women